Sinduria is a census town in Garhwa district in the Indian state of Jharkhand.

Demographics
 India census, Sinduria had a population of 5,262. Males constitute 2,801 and females 2,461. Sinduria has an average literacy rate of 75.54%, higher than the state average of 66.41%,  male literacy is  83.27%, and female literacy is 66.64%. In Sinduria, 3.38% of the population is under 6 years of age with 704 children.

Transport
Sinduria is located on road connecting  Majhiaon and Nagar Untari. BSRTC runs bus services from Garhwa to the town. Sinduria railway station is located on the northern part of the town.

References

Cities and towns in Garhwa district